The ring-tailed gecko (Cyrtodactylus louisiadensis) is a species of gecko that is endemic to the Louisiade Archipelago of Papua New Guinea.

References 

Cyrtodactylus
Reptiles described in 1892